Khasi Cinema is the term used to refer to the Khasi language film industry based in Shillong in Meghalaya, India. In 1981, Hamlet Bareh Ngapkynta's 1981 film Ka Synjuk Ri ki Laiphew Syiem became the first ever film in Khasi. Years later, Ardhendu Bhattacharya's 1984 film Manik Raitong became the first ever color film in the Khasi language. After the 2000s when militancy in the state came down drastically, a market for entertainment and movies opened up. Many short films and telefilms began being produced in the Khasi language. The production of feature films in Khasi got a major fillip after the entry of national award winning filmmakers like Pradip Kurbah into the scene.

Notable Films 

 Ka Synjuk Ri ki Laiphew Syiem (The Alliance of 30 Kings) (1981)
 Manik Raitong (1984)
 Ri: The Homeland of Uncertainty (2014) - won National award, screened at IFFI Goa.
 Onaatah: Of The Earth (2016) -  won national award, available in Netflix, remade in Marathi.
 Iewduh (2019) - premiered at Busan Film Festival

References 

Meghalaya
Cinema by language of India
Film genres